Pixta Ltd.  (stylized PIXSTA) is a UK-based image and video search company founded in 2006 by Alexander Straub, Dr. Daniel Heesch, and David Williams.

Implementation
Pixsta's first role was as an online advertising network for fashion retail. Its database of images comprises the online collections of multiple fashion retailers – effectively, advertisers. The system is a ‘closed’ system: search term images must be an image from the database; submitting any such image brings up other images from the database as results.

Pixsta's AdImages generates revenue from the advertisers in the form of click-throughs, which take the visitor directly to the appropriate product page on the retailer site. When on a media brand's website, Click-through revenue is shared between Pixsta and the media brand. Pixsta's 'ImageSense' allows publishers to price contextual pages via image matching technology. Ads displayed are heavily targeted by their visual attributes.

Milestones
Pixsta revealed early deployments in November 2006, but didn't make any further formal statements until May 2008. At this time it announced several live pilot deployments. The company alluded to further online advertising networks in other industries where goods are sold on their visual appearance, including shoes, art, antiques and home furnishings.

The company also claimed that the Pixsta image search engine is sufficiently accurate and sophisticated to enable its use in facial recognition applications.

References

Internet search engines